The white-faced storm petrel (Pelagodroma marina), also known as white-faced petrel is a small seabird of the austral storm petrel family Oceanitidae. It is the only member of the monotypic genus Pelagodroma.

Description
It has a pale brown to grey back, rump and wings with black flight feathers. It is white below, unlike other north Atlantic petrels, and has a white face with a black eye mask like a phalarope. Its plumage makes it one of the easier petrels to identify at sea.

Behaviour
The white-faced storm petrel is strictly pelagic outside the breeding season, and this, together with its often-remote breeding sites, makes this petrel a difficult bird to see from land. Only in severe storms might this species be pushed into headlands. There have been a handful of western Europe records from France, the United Kingdom and the Netherlands. It has a direct gliding flight and will patter on the water surface as it picks planktonic food items from the ocean surface. It is highly gregarious, but does not follow ships. Like most petrels, its walking ability is limited to a short shuffle to the burrow.

Breeding

The white-faced storm petrel breeds on remote islands in the south Atlantic, such as Tristan da Cunha and also Australia and New Zealand. There are north Atlantic colonies on the Cape Verde Islands, Canary Islands and Savage Islands. It nests in colonies close to the sea in rock crevices and lays a single white egg. It spends the rest of the year at sea. It is strictly nocturnal at the breeding sites to avoid predation by gulls and skuas, and will even avoid coming to land on clear moonlit nights.

Subspecies
Here are six recognised subspecies, breeding in island colonies through subtropical to subantarctic regions of the Atlantic, Indian and south-western Pacific Oceans:

P. m. albiclunis , 1951 – Kermadec Islands
P. m. dulciae  – islands off southern Australia
P. m. eadesi  – Cape Verde Islands
P. m. hypoleuca  – Savage Islands
P. m. maoriana  – islands around New Zealand, including the Chatham and Auckland Islands
P. m. marina  – Tristan da Cunha and Gough Island (Nominate subspecies)

Status and conservation
Widespread throughout its large range, the white-faced storm petrel is evaluated as Least Concern on the IUCN Red List of Threatened Species.

References

External links
BirdLife Species Factsheet
 The white-faced storm petrel discussed in RNZ Critter of the Week,  24 Jul 2020

white-faced storm petrel
white-faced storm petrel
Birds of the Atlantic Ocean
Birds of Oceania
white-faced storm petrel
white-faced storm petrel